Coprosma putida, commonly known as stinkwood, is a flowering plant in the family Rubiaceae. The Latin specific epithet putida means "stinking", alluding to the stench produced when the plant is cut or bruised, including the leaves and fruit.

Description
It is a shrub or small tree growing to 4 m in height. The broadly elliptic-oblong leaves are 40–110 mm long, 25–80 mm wide. The small, greenish-white flowers are 8 mm long. The fleshy, red fruits are 20 mm long. The flowering season is from August to early November.

Distribution and habitat
The species is endemic to Australia’s subtropical Lord Howe Island in the Tasman Sea. It is common and widespread at all elevations in sheltered forest.

References

putida
Endemic flora of Lord Howe Island
Plants described in 1869
Gentianales of Australia
Taxa named by Charles Moore
Taxa named by Ferdinand von Mueller